Charlie Palmer (born 1959) is an American chef, hospitality entrepreneur, hotelier, and author. He is best known for Aureole, his flagship restaurant in New York City, which has earned 13 Michelin stars and two James Beard awards. Considered a “pioneer of progressive American cooking,” Palmer has received over 20 Michelin stars and consults 15 F&B outlets through the Charlie Palmer Collective.

Career

After graduating from The Culinary Institute of America, Palmer began his executive chef career at the River Café in 1983, where he earned three stars from The New York Times and trained Michael Mina. 

In 1988, Palmer opened his restaurant Aureole in Manhattan, where he showcased regional American ingredients. In 1999, he opened Aureole in the Mandalay Bay Resort, Las Vegas as well as a modern American steakhouse, Charlie Palmer Steak in The Four Seasons. 

In April 2006, he announced plans for the Charlie Palmer Hotel to be constructed in Las Vegas. In 2009, Aureole moved its location to One Bryant Park in midtown Manhattan.

In March 2021, Palmer converted Aureole New York to Charlie Palmer Steak NYC.

In June 2022, Palmer and Christopher Hunsberger announced their launch of Appellation, a culinary-focused hotel concept. The brand is set to debut in Sun Valley, Idaho in 2023 and plans to open two California locations in 2023 and 2024.

In October 2022, he opened AperiBar, an aperitif-focused eatery the Luma Hotel in Time Square.

Television
Palmer was one of sixteen chefs in the 1993 PBS series, Cooking with Master Chefs: Hosted by Julia Child and is included in the cookbook derived from the series. 

In 2020, Palmer launched a video series titled American Artisan where he highlights Wine Country artisans.   He is also a guest on NBC's Today Show, Bravo's Top Chef, and The Rachael Ray Show.

Awards
The James Beard Foundation named him "Best Chef in America" in 1997 and incorporated him as a member of their "Who's Who of Food & Beverage in America" in 1998.

In 2011, Palmer was inducted into the Gaming Hall of Fame. 

Palmer's support of his alma mater earned him a seat on The Culinary Institute of America's board of trustees where he served as chairman of the board from 2013 to 2016. The school presented him with an honorary doctorate in April 2018.

Nine of Palmer’s restaurants have been granted the Award of Excellence by Wine Spectator from 2001-2022.

Restaurants 
Aureole (NYC)
Charlie Palmer Steak NYC 
Charlie Palmer at The Knick (NYC)
St. Cloud Rooftop Bar (Knickerbocker Hotel, NYC)
AVA Social and Spyglass Rooftop Bar (Archer Hotel, NYC)
Willow (Rhinebeck, New York)
Charlie Palmer Steak (Washington, D.C.)
Aureole at Mandalay Bay (Las Vegas)
Charlie Palmer Steak at Four Seasons (Las Vegas)
Charlie Palmer Steak (Reno, Nevada)
Charlie Palmer Steak and Sky & Vine Rooftop Bar (Archer Hotel, Napa)
Dry Creek Kitchen (Hotel Healdsburg, California)
AperiBar (NYC)

Cookbooks 
 Great American Food (Random House, 1996)
 Charlie Palmer's Casual Cooking (Harper Collins, 2001)
 The Art of Aureole (Ten Speed, 2002)
 Charlie Palmer's Practical Guide to the New American Kitchen (Melcher, 2006)
 Remington Camp Cooking by Charlie Palmer (Charlie Palmer Group, 2013)
 Charlie Palmer's American Fare (Grand Central Life & Style, 2015)

References

External links
 Charlie Palmer

Living people
American chefs
American male chefs
Culinary Institute of America people
James Beard Foundation Award winners
Date of birth missing (living people)
Year of birth missing (living people)